USNS Loyal (T-AGOS-22) is a Victorious-class ocean surveillance ship acquired by the U.S. Navy in 1993 and assigned to the Navy's Special Missions Program.

Built and Particulars
Loyal was built by Mc Dermott Shipyards, Morgan City, Louisiana. She was laid down on 7 October 1991 and launched 19 September 1992 and was delivered to the Navy on 1 July 1993 which assigned her to the Military Sealift Command (MSC) Special Missions Program.

Vessel particulars -

FPO AE 09577-4018

IMO Number : 8926640

Callsign : NLYL

MMSI : 367835000

Mission 
The mission of Loyal is to directly support the Navy by using passive sonar arrays to detect and track undersea threats.

Operational history 
The USNS Loyal used Sasebo as a base in 2011, and was deployed in the Pacific Ocean.
She called Sasebo in January 2011 and Subic bay (Philippines) in April 2012

Note 
There is no journal entry on Loyal at DANFS.

References 

 NavSource Online: Service Ship Photo Archive - T-AGOS-22 Loyal
 Special Mission Program 
 Military Sealift Command - Ship Inventory - USNS LOYAL   (T-AGOS 22) - Ocean Surveillance Ship

Victorious-class ocean surveillance ships
Ships built in Morgan City, Louisiana
Small waterplane area twin hull vessels
1992 ships